The fourth season of the Chinese reality talent show Sing! China premiered on 19 July 2019, on Zhejiang Television. Harlem Yu returned as a coach for his third season. Na Ying, who last coached in the second season, returned with new coaches Li Ronghao and Wang Leehom, who all replaced Jay Chou, Li Jian and Nicholas Tse as coaches. On 7 October, Xing Hanming 邢晗铭 of Team Ronghao was announced as the winner of the season, making her the first female winner of Sing! China. This also marked Ronghao's first win as coach. Sidanmanchu 斯丹曼簇 of Team Na Ying, Nasi Li 李芷婷 of Team Leehom, and Chen Qinan 陈其楠 of Team Harlem finished runner-up, third, and fourth places, respectively. This marks the first instance of the Top 3 artists being all female.

Coaches and hosts

Teams
 Colour key

Blind auditions 
Similar from the previous season, the blind auditions would see the coaches listening to the contestants' performances while they faced away from the stage. If they like what they hear from a contestant, they press the button on their chairs which would rotate them to face the stage. This signifies that the contestant has been recruited to join the respective coach's team. If more than one coach presses their button, the contestant would then choose the coach they want to work with. If none of the coaches presses their button, the losing artist would leave the stage straight away, without any conversations with the coaches, and the chairs would remain unturned (though this rule could be reversed upon request from the coaches).

The performance order during the blind auditions would be decided on the spot by the coaches. The coaches would be given a list of songs which the artists would be performing, and the coaches would take turn to pick the songs which they would like to hear first, and the respective artist would be called upon the stage to perform the song. Therefore, the artists would only be notified of their performance order minutes before their performances. Before the artists perform, they would each select a coach which they would like to work with the most, and the coach's head shot would be shown in real-time on the large screen attached to their respective chairs during their performance. This allows the artists to see how their preferred coaches are reacting to their performances while the latter is facing away from the stage, thus potentially influencing the artist's final choice of coach.

In this season, a new feature named as the "mute-the-mic" button was added during the blind auditions. This allows the coaches to block one coach from pitching to an artist by having the particular coach's chair faced away from the stage and muting their personal microphone. Despite the block, the coach would still be available for selection by the artist as their coach. Unlike the previous season, there is no limit in the number of artists that can be recruited on a team.

 Colour key

Episode 1 (19 July)
The four coaches performed a medley of each other's songs – Li Ronghao performed Wang Leehom's "Kiss Goodbye", Wang performed Na Ying's "梦一场", Na performed Harlem Yu's "改变所有的错", and Yu performed "龙的传人". All coaches later joined forces and performed a remixed version of "龙的传人".

Episode 2 (26 July)

Episode 3 (2 August)

 Not broadcast fully.
 Button was pressed by Wang Leehom.

Episode 4 (9 August)

 Not broadcast fully.

Episode 5 (16 August)

 Not broadcast fully.

The Cross Battles

The four mentors are divided into two groups for a duel. The teams of the two main battle instructors are divided into four or five rounds to decide the winner, with the winning team receiving one point and the losing team receiving no points. Each coach has a one-time bonus point (via the coach's trump card) that can be used on any artist on his team. If that artist who was given the coach's trump card wins the duel, he or she will receive two points, otherwise he will still not receive points. The team with the highest points wins and all of his/her artists will advance to the next card, while the losing coach will eliminate two artists from his/her team as a punishment.

In episode 8, the winning coaches from episode 6 and 7 had a duel and the same rules apply in this round.

Colour key

The Cross Knockouts
Before the Cross Knockout, each coach has to eliminate half of his/her teammates, which means team Ronghao, team Harlem, team Na Ying, and team Leehom will remain six, six, three, and seven artists, respectively. Besides, the "Block" is allowed for coaches in this round to avoid some artists have to compete with the strongest artist on each team. The artist will perform based on the ascending of coaches by draw, and he/she will decide his/her opponent by draw as well. If the artist is used the "Block" by the coach, which means he/she may not face a certain artist from another team by default. At the end of each Cross Knockout, the two artists will receive votes of approval from a 51-person judging panel. The artist with the most votes will advance to the Playoffs, while the other would be eliminated.

Colour key

The Playoffs
The Top 11 performed in the Playoffs for a spot in the finals. The selection of the winner may be different,  depending on which team the artist belongs to. For Team Na Ying and Team Harlem, the remaining two artists will perform a song respectively, and their coaches will choose one as their winners. For Team Ronghao, the coach assigned his teammates have a duo, and the coach has to choose one of them as a winner, which is similar to the Battles of The Voice series. For Team Leehom, since five artists advance to the Playoff, the selection of finalists is divided into two parts. Five artists will perform a solo song, and two  will advance to the second round. This selection method is similar to the six-chair challenge of The X Factor series. The rule of the second round is same as Team Na Ying and Team Harlem.

Finals
The Top 4 performed live in a two-part season finale on 7 October, held at the Beijing National Stadium. In the first round of the competition, the four finalists performed a duet with their coach, and a solo song. Based on the public votes received from the live audience at the end of the first round, the bottom two artists with the fewest votes would be eliminated.

The final two artists would then sing their winner's song before an 81-person panel and live audience, who will vote for the winner at the end of the performances. Every member of the panel would be entitled to one vote, and the total number of votes received by the artists from the panel and live audience would be converted into percentage points accordingly. The artist who received the highest number of points would be announced as the winner.

Non-competition shows

The Mid-Autumn Special (12 September) 
The ninth episode was a two-hour special aired on 12 September, featuring performances by the coaches and artists in celebration of the Mid-Autumn Festival. The episode was hosted by Yi Yi.

The National Day Special (4 October) 
The fourteenth episode was a two-hour special episode aired on 4 October, featuring performances by the coaches and artists in celebration of the National Day of the People's Republic of China. The episode was taped on 28 September 2019, at the Cotai Arena.

Reception

CSM52 ratings

References

2019 in Chinese music
2019 Chinese television seasons